Hendricus "Henk" Johannes Petrus Vos (born 5 June 1968) is a Dutch former professional footballer who played as a forward.

Career
Vos was born in Wouw, Netherlands. He started his professional career in the 1984–85 season for RBC Roosendaal. Later on, he played in Belgium and France, returning to Holland to play for Feyenoord in 1996. For the 2007–08 season he played at RBC Roosendaal on an amateur basis.

He ended his career in 2009, yet restarted as an amateur player for KFC Meerle in Belgium in early 2010 before playing  half a year with the Dutch side De Fendert.

Coaching career
During his time at RBC from 2006 to 2009, Vos worked as a youth coach for the club. In February 2012, Vos was appointed manager of VV Kogelvangers. He was at the club until the end of the season, before joining the technical staff of FC Dordrecht as a forward coach and assistant manager for the Jong Dordrecht team. He left the position at the end of 2013. He later became a youth coach at NAC Breda but was released in June 2016 after an incident where Vos was involved in a fight with a security guard, who broke his nose. Vos was later arrested during the investigation.

Ahead of the 2018–19 season, Vos returned to RBC as a player-manager and responsible for the club's youth sector. The club announced on 20 April 2019, that he had been fired.

Vos has also been a coach at the Feyenoord soccer schools for several years.

Career statistics

Honours

Club
Standard Liège
 Belgian Cup: 1992–93

Feyenoord
 Eredivisie: 1998–99

Beerschot A.C.
 Belgian Cup: 2004–05

References

External links
  Profile

1968 births
Living people
Sportspeople from Roosendaal
Dutch footballers
Association football forwards
Feyenoord players
PSV Eindhoven players
RBC Roosendaal players
FC Eindhoven players
TOP Oss players
FC Den Bosch players
NAC Breda players
Eredivisie players
Eerste Divisie players
Belgian Pro League players
Ligue 1 players
Ligue 2 players
Willem II (football club) players
FC Metz players
Beerschot A.C. players
K.R.C. Mechelen players
FC Sochaux-Montbéliard players
Standard Liège players
Dutch football managers
RBC Roosendaal managers
Dutch expatriate footballers
Dutch expatriate sportspeople in Belgium
Expatriate footballers in Belgium
Dutch expatriate sportspeople in France
Expatriate footballers in France
Footballers from North Brabant